Skyness is the second album by Dan Costa. Recorded in Italy, the album features several renowned artists, such as bossa nova icon Roberto Menescal, Romero Lubambo, Nelson Faria and Seamus Blake. It was considered "rare and luxurious" by All About Jazz.

Reception

All About Jazz praises the album for its "lovely melodies, sophisticated harmonies, and soulful contributions of seven world- class artists", while Raul da Gama from World Music Report considers Costa "deeply gifted". The track "Compelling (ft. Teco Cardoso)" was dubbed 'uplifting' and featured by JAZZIZ magazine in their summer album., while Leitão commends the album for "excellent music and exceptional artistic quality".

Track listing
 "Prologue"
 "Tempos Sentidos" (featuring Roberto Menescal & Jorge Helder)
 "Compelling" (featuring Teco Cardoso)
 "Lisbon Skyline" (featuring Custodio Castelo)
 "Intracycle"
 "Sete Enredos" (featuring Romero Lubambo)
 "Iremia"
 "Lume" (featuring Nelson Faria)
 "Skyness" (featuring Seamus Blake)

Personnel
Piano, compositions, production - Dan Costa
Acoustic guitar - Roberto Menescal
Double bass - Jorge Helder
Flute - Teco Cardoso
Portuguese guitar - Custodio Castelo
Acoustic guitar - Romero Lubambo
Electric guitar - Nelson Faria
Tenor sax - Seamus Blake

References

2018 albums